Eugene Andrew Gordon (July 10, 1917 – May 4, 2002) was a United States district judge of the United States District Court for the Middle District of North Carolina.

Education and career

Born in Brown Summit, North Carolina, Gordon received an Artium Baccalaureus degree from Elon College in 1941 and a Bachelor of Laws from Duke University School of Law in 1941. He was in private practice in Alamance County, North Carolina from 1941 to 1942, and then served in the United States Army during World War II, from 1942 to 1946. He returned to private practice from 1946 to 1964, also serving as commanding officer of the National Guard in Burlington, North Carolina from 1946 to 1947, and as solicitor of the general county court of Alamance County from 1947 to 1954, and county attorney of Alamance County from 1954 to 1964.

Federal judicial service

On April 30, 1964, Gordon was nominated by President Lyndon B. Johnson to a seat on the United States District Court for the Middle District of North Carolina vacated by Judge L. Richardson Preyer. Gordon was confirmed by the United States Senate on May 27, 1964, and received his commission on June 9, 1964. He served as Chief Judge from 1971 to 1982, assuming senior status on July 12, 1982 and serving in that capacity until his death on May 4, 2002, in Greensboro, North Carolina.

References

Sources
 

1917 births
2002 deaths
Judges of the United States District Court for the Middle District of North Carolina
United States district court judges appointed by Lyndon B. Johnson
20th-century American judges
United States Army officers
People from Browns Summit, North Carolina